The San Jose Spiders were a women's professional basketball team in the National Women's Basketball League (NWBL).  Based in San Jose, California, they played from 2005 to 2006. Notable players included Brittany Jackson, Julie McBride, Lindsey Yamasaki, and Natalie Nakase.

Team Record
2005 – 5–19 
2006 – 7–11

External links
NWBL website (archive link)

Basketball teams in the San Francisco Bay Area